The Nutcracker Suite is an album by American pianist, composer and bandleader Duke Ellington recorded for Columbia Records in 1960 featuring jazz interpretations of the 1892 ballet "The Nutcracker" by Tchaikovsky, arranged by Ellington and Billy Strayhorn.

Track listing
All compositions by Pyotr Ilyich Tchaikovsky

 "Overture" - 3:22
 "Toot Toot Tootie Toot (Dance of the Reed-Pipes)" - 2:30
 "Peanut Brittle Brigade (March)" - 4:37
 "Sugar Rum Cherry (Dance of the Sugar-Plum Fairy)" - 3:05
 "Entr'acte" - 1:53
 "Volga Vouty (Russian Dance)" - 2:52  
 "Chinoiserie (Chinese Dance)" - 2:50  
 "Danse of the Floreadores (Waltz of the Flowers)" - 4:04  
 "Arabesque Cookie (Arabian Dance)" - 5:44

Recorded on May 26 (tracks 1 and 5), May 31 (track 2), June 3 (tracks 4 and 8), 21 (tracks 3 and 7) and 22 (tracks 6 and 9), 1960.

Personnel
Duke Ellington – piano
Willie Cook, Fats Ford, Ray Nance, Clark Terry - trumpet
Lawrence Brown, Booty Wood, Britt Woodman - trombone
Juan Tizol - valve trombone
Jimmy Hamilton - clarinet, tenor saxophone
Johnny Hodges - alto saxophone 
Russell Procope - alto saxophone, clarinet
Paul Gonsalves - tenor saxophone
Harry Carney - baritone saxophone, clarinet, bass clarinet
Aaron Bell - bass 
Sam Woodyard - drums

References

Christmas albums by American artists
Columbia Records Christmas albums
Duke Ellington albums
1960 Christmas albums
The Nutcracker
Jazz Christmas albums
Albums recorded at Radio Recorders